The 2017 South American Youth Football Championship was the 28th edition of the South American Youth Football Championship, a football competition for the under-20 national teams in South America organized by CONMEBOL. It was held in Ecuador from 18 January to 11 February 2017.

Uruguay were crowned champions, and together with Ecuador, Venezuela and Argentina, which were the top four teams of this tournament, qualified for the 2017 FIFA U-20 World Cup in South Korea.

Teams
All ten CONMEBOL member national teams entered the tournament.

Squads

Each team may register a squad of 23 players (three of whom must be goalkeepers).

Venues

A total of eight venues in seven cities were proposed by FEF in July 2016, days later Latacunga was added as a possible venue. Tulcán was also nominated, but was finally dismissed along with Cuenca, Machala and Portoviejo. Eventually, five venues were confirmed to host the matches, Estadio Bellavista in Ambato, Estadio Olímpico de Riobamba in Riobamba and Estadio La Cocha in Latacunga for the Group A; Estadio Olímpico de Ibarra in Ibarra for the Group B while the final stage took place at Estadio Olímpico Atahualpa in Quito. However, on 5 January 2017, Estadio La Cocha in Latacunga was dropped as refurbishment work was not completed in time.

Match officials
The referees were:

 Darío Herrera
Assistants: Diego Bonfá and Cristian Navarro
 Gery Vargas
Assistants: Juan Pablo Montaño and José Antelo
 Anderson Daronco
Assistants: Rodrigo Correa and Guilherme Dias Camilo
 Roberto Tobar
Assistants: Raúl Orellana and José Retamal
 Gustavo Murillo
Assistants: Humberto Clavijo and John Alexander León

 Carlos Orbe
Assistants: Juan Carlos Macías and Flavio Nall
 Mario Díaz de Vivar
Assistants: Milcíades Saldívar and Darío Gaona 
 Diego Haro
Assistants: Raúl López Cruz and Víctor Ráez
 Jonhatan Fuentes
Assistants: Richard Trinidad and Gabriel Popovits
 Jesús Valenzuela
Assistants: Jorge Urrego and Franchescoly Chacón

Draw
Originally, the draw was scheduled for 30 November 2016 in Montevideo but had to be postponed due to crash of LaMia Flight 2933 that occurred on 28 November 2016. It was rescheduled to be held on 7 December 2016, 11:00 PYT (UTC−3), at the CONMEBOL headquarters in Luque, Paraguay. The ten teams were drawn into two groups of five. Ecuador (hosts) and Argentina (title holders) were seeded into Group A and Group B respectively and assigned to position 1 in their group, while the remaining teams were placed into four "pairing pots" according to their results in the 2015 South American U-20 Championship (shown in brackets).

First stage
The top three teams in each group advanced to the final stage.

Tiebreakers
When teams finished level of points, the final rankings were determined according to:
 goal difference
 goals scored
 head-to-head result between tied teams (two teams only)
 drawing of lots

All times local, ECT (UTC−5).

Group A

Group B

Final stage
When teams finished level of points, the final rankings were determined according to the same criteria as the first stage, taking into account only matches in the final stage.

Winners

Goalscorers

5 goals

 Lautaro Martínez
 Marcelo Torres
 Bryan Cabezas
 Rodrigo Amaral

4 goals

 Felipe Vizeu
 Pervis Estupiñán

3 goals

 Éver Valencia
 Jordy Caicedo
 Nicolás de la Cruz
 Nicolás Schiappacasse
 Yeferson Soteldo

2 goals

 Brian Mansilla
 Guilherme Arana
 Richarlison
 Damir Ceter
 Juan Camilo Hernández
 Herlin Lino
 Pedro Báez
 Jesús Medina
 Roberto Siucho
 Joaquín Ardaiz
 Ronaldo Chacón
 Yangel Herrera

1 goal

 Tomás Conechny
 Lucas Rodríguez
 Bruno Miranda
 Ronaldo Monteiro
 Ramiro Vaca
 Matheus Sávio
 Maycon
 Ignacio Jara
 José Luis Sierra
 Jorge Obregón
 Washington Corozo
 Renny Jaramillo
 Joel Quintero
 Jordan Sierra
 Sebastián Ferreira
 Cristhian Paredes
 Rodrigo Bentancur
 Mathías Olivera
 Agustín Rogel
 Matías Viña
 Facundo Waller
 Sergio Córdova
 Josua Mejías

Own goal
 Agustín Rogel (playing against Argentina)

Qualified teams for FIFA U-20 World Cup
The following four teams from CONMEBOL qualified for the 2017 FIFA U-20 World Cup.

1 Bold indicates champion for that year. Italic indicates host for that year.

References

External links

Sudamericano Sub 20 Ecuador 2017 

2017
2017 South American Youth Championship
2017 in South American football
2017 in Ecuadorian football
2017 in youth association football
January 2017 sports events in South America
February 2017 sports events in South America